Alan Caligiuri (born Giussano, Italy, 19 September 1981) is a radio host and writer for Italian television, radio show co-host of the Lo Zoo di 105 broadcast by Radio 105 Network.

Career
Alan Caligiuri was born in Giussano and grew up in Seregno, by parents from Calabria.
His career in show business started at the satellite channel TV MODA of the singer Jo Squillo while the eponymous program on Rete 4.
He collaborated in the organization of the program Le Iene on Italia 1 and for the Festival di Sanremo in 2000 and 2001. In 2006, lead on Match Music the program Hot, airing Monday through Friday in the company of Karim De Martino and Isa B.
Among his experiences: a promo appearance in Tema for La7, "Vivere" and "Emporio per vivere" always as appearance; dubbing Sting for TV MODA on Rete 4; parts in the "Armadillo magazine" broadcast on Odeon TV; he also co-presented "Il programma del Capitano" (The Captain's program) with Francesco Facchinetti on RTL 102.5 TV; he posted for three services (created and played by him) in Le Iene on Italia 1 and Veejay on Match Music.
In 2009, he exposed the case of "rigged votes" at the Festival di Sanremo and he realize two services for Striscia la Notizia on Canale 5.
From 2010 to 2016 he was part of the radio program Lo Zoo di 105, where he helped with skits and making prank phone calls.

Filmography
 Mario (2013)
 On Air: Storia di un successo (2016)

References

Italian radio presenters
1981 births
Living people
People from Brianza
People of Calabrian descent